, there were 780 electric vehicles registered in Mississippi, equivalent to 0.04% of all vehicles in the state.

In 2022, Mississippi was ranked by LendingTree as the worst state in the United States for electric vehicle ownership.

Government policy
, the state government does not offer any tax incentives for electric vehicle purchases.

In 2018, the state government introduced an annual $150 registration fee for electric vehicles, and a $75 fee for plug-in hybrid vehicles.

Charging stations
, there were 301 public charging station ports in Mississippi.

The Infrastructure Investment and Jobs Act, signed into law in November 2021, allocates  to charging stations in Mississippi.

, Mississippi has the lowest number of DC charging stations per capita (age 16 and older) in the United States.

By region

Jackson
In 2021, the Jackson metropolitan area was ranked by The New York Times as the worst metropolitan area in the United States (out of the 100 most populous) for electric vehicle ownership.

References

Mississippi
Road transportation in Mississippi